Anameromorpha unicolor is a species of beetle in the family Cerambycidae. It was described by Maurice Pic in 1923. It is known from Vietnam.

References

Lamiini
Beetles described in 1923